The forktails are small insectivorous birds in the genus Enicurus. They were formerly in the thrush family, Turdidae, but are more often now treated as part of the Old World flycatcher family, Muscicapidae. Their name derives from their long forked tail.

These are southeast Asian forest species principally associated with mountain forests and streams. Most nest in rock crevices, laying 2–4 eggs.

Species
The genus contains the following eight species:
 Little forktail, Enicurus scouleri
 Sunda forktail, Enicurus velatus
 Chestnut-naped forktail, Enicurus ruficapillus
 Black-backed forktail, Enicurus immaculatus
 Slaty-backed forktail, Enicurus schistaceus
 White-crowned forktail, Enicurus leschenaulti
 Bornean forktail, Enicurus borneensis
 Spotted forktail, Enicurus maculatus

References